The 2017 Austrian motorcycle Grand Prix was the eleventh round of the 2017 MotoGP season. It was held at the Red Bull Ring in Spielberg on August 13, 2017.

Classification

MotoGP

Moto2

Moto3

Championship standings after the race

MotoGP
Below are the standings for the top five riders and constructors after round eleven has concluded.

Riders' Championship standings

Constructors' Championship standings

 Note: Only the top five positions are included for both sets of standings.

Moto2

Moto3

References

Austrian
Motorcycle Grand Prix
Austrian motorcycle Grand Prix
Austrian